International football generally refers to association football matches between representative national teams carried out under the regulation of the Fédération Internationale de Football Association (FIFA). It can also refer to :

 International Federation of American Football (IFAF)
 International rules football

See also 
 Non-FIFA international football
 List of men's national association football teams
 List of women's national association football teams